The 1902 Howard Bulldogs football team was an American football team that represented Howard College (now known as the Samford University) as an independent during the 1902 college football season. In their first year under head coach Houston Gwin, the team compiled a record of 3–1.

Schedule

References

Howard
Samford Bulldogs football seasons
Howard Bulldogs football